World So Bright is the debut album by the American power pop musician Adam Schmitt, released in 1991.

Schmitt supported the album by opening for the BoDeans on a North American tour.

Production
Recorded at Chicago Recording Company and in Schmitt's Champaign, Illinois, basement, the album was produced by Greg Edward and Schmitt. It contains contributions from Lisa Germano, Kenny Aronoff, and Jay Bennett.

Critical reception

Trouser Press thought that the "well-crafted songs are mega-tuneful guitar-driven gems with hooks galore and lyrics that rise above the prosaic 'boy meets girl/boy loses girl/boy misses girl/boy goes looking for another girl' fodder." The Chicago Tribune determined that "the album's dozen songs resound with the innate humability that informs the best work of Squeeze, XTC and the dB's."

The Palm Beach Post wrote: "A hopeful romantic, [Schmitt] infuses love song after love song with memorable hooks. A tough, heartfelt delivery gives them an added edge." The Republican concluded that "it's pop alright, but the hooks don't hook and the thing don't swing." Rolling Stone called it "more than a promising debut, it's a confident piece of work from a canny singer-songwriter who's going to be around for a good long while."

AllMusic wrote that "things are less impressive when the amps get cranked too high ('River Black'), but fortunately that's not a frequent mistake, and one that's more than redeemed by songs like the wistful, touching ballad 'Elizabeth Einstein'." MusicHound Rock: The Essential Album Guide deemed the album "a flawless disc," writing that the title track is a "symmetrical diamond."

Track listing

References

1991 albums
Reprise Records albums